Coniston is a civil parish in the South Lakeland District of Cumbria, England. It contains 53 listed buildings that are recorded in the National Heritage List for England. Of these, four are listed at Grade II*, the middle of the three grades, and the others are at Grade II, the lowest grade. The parish is in the Lake District National Park and is located to the west, north and east of Coniston Water. Most of the listed buildings are houses and associated structures, farmhouses and farm buildings. The other listed buildings include bridges, a limekiln, a folly, a boundary stone, a church, a drinking fountain, and a memorial.


Key

Buildings

References

Citations

Sources

Lists of listed buildings in Cumbria